The Anderson Rebels were a minor league baseball club that existed between 1946 and 1954. The team, based in Anderson, South Carolina, was a member of the class-B Tri-State League. In 1946, the team was initially established as the Anderson A's and were affiliated with the New York Giants. The next season the club became an independent and was renamed the Anderson Rebels. The team later became affiliated with the Pittsburgh Pirates, St. Louis Browns and Baltimore Orioles before disbanding in 1954.

The Anderson Rebels and Anderson A's were preceded in Anderson by the Anderson Electricians who played as members of the South Carolina League (1907), Carolina Association (1908–1912) and Palmetto League (1931).

Year-by-year record

Defunct minor league baseball teams
Baseball teams established in 1946
Baseball teams disestablished in 1954
1946 establishments in South Carolina
1954 disestablishments in South Carolina
Baltimore Orioles minor league affiliates
New York Giants minor league affiliates
Pittsburgh Pirates minor league affiliates
St. Louis Browns minor league affiliates
Professional baseball teams in South Carolina
Anderson, South Carolina